The 1958 Buffalo Bulls football team represented the University at Buffalo in the 1958 NCAA College Division football season. The Bulls offense scored 236 points while the defense allowed 101 points. The team won the Lambert Cup, emblematic of supremacy in Eastern U.S. small-college football. The Bulls were invited to play in the 1958 Tangerine Bowl against Florida State. The team voted to turn down the bowl invitation after learning that they would be allowed to participate only if the team's two black players, back-up defensive end Mike Wilson and starting halfback Willie Evans, did not play in the game. The 1958 Bulls team was profiled on ESPN's Outside the Lines in 2008. Buffalo was not invited to or be bowl-eligible for another 50 years.

Schedule

References

Buffalo
Buffalo Bulls football seasons
Buffalo Bulls football